Tidal diamonds are symbols on British admiralty charts that indicate the direction and speed of tidal streams.

The symbols consist of a letter of the ISO basic Latin alphabet in a rhombus, printed in purple ink. On any particular chart each tidal diamond will have a unique letter starting from "A" and continuing alphabetically.

Somewhere on the chart, generally on land, will be a Tidal Diamond table. This contains a grid of thirteen rows and three columns for each Diamond. The rows are the hours of the tidal cycle showing the 6 hours before high water, high water itself and the 6 hours after high water. The columns show the bearing of the tidal stream and its speed, in knots, at both spring tide and neap tide. The times on the table are related to the high water of the standard port displayed on the table.

An alternative to a tidal diamond is a tidal atlas which are often more accurate and easier to use (if available).

References 

Navigation
Tides